Stowe is a civil parish in Shropshire, England.  It contains seven listed buildings that are recorded in the National Heritage List for England.  Of these, one is listed at Grade II*, the middle of the three grades, and the others are at Grade II, the lowest grade.  The parish contains the village of Stowe and smaller settlements, and is otherwise rural.  The most important listed building is a church in Stowe village.  Near the southern border of the parish are a listed railway station and a telephone kiosk, and the other listed buildings are farmhouses and farm buildings.


Key

Buildings

References

Citations

Sources

Lists of buildings and structures in Shropshire